European route E 846 is a European B class road in Italy, connecting the cities Cosenza – Crotone.

Route 
 
 E45 Cosenza
 E90 Crotone

External links 
 UN Economic Commission for Europe: Overall Map of E-road Network (2007)
 International E-road network

International E-road network
Roads in Italy